Portrait of Paul Chenavard is an 1869 oil on canvas portrait by Gustave Courbet, showing his friend and fellow artist Paul Chenavard aged 62. It was probably produced in Munich during Chenavard's exhibition of The Divine Tragedy, which he had produced for the Panthéon but which had hit difficulties. The portrait is now in the Musée des Beaux-Arts de Lyon.

References

Chenavard
Chenavard
Paintings by Gustave Courbet
1869 paintings